Kosmos 2241 ( meaning Cosmos 2241) was a Russian US-K missile early warning satellite that was launched in 1993 as part of the Russian Space Forces' Oko programme. The satellite was designed to identify missile launches using optical telescopes and infrared sensors.

Kosmos 2241 was launched from Site 43/4 at Plesetsk Cosmodrome in Russia. A Molniya-M carrier rocket with a 2BL upper stage was used to perform the launch, which took place at 19:07 UTC on 6 April 1993. The launch successfully placed the satellite into a molniya orbit. It subsequently received its Kosmos designation, and the international designator 1993-051A. The United States Space Command assigned it the Satellite Catalog Number 22594.

On 8 March 2022, Kosmos 2241 decayed from orbit and reentered the atmosphere.

See also

List of Kosmos satellites (2001–2250)
List of R-7 launches (1990–1994)
1993 in spaceflight
List of Oko satellites

References

Kosmos satellites
Spacecraft launched in 1993
Spacecraft which reentered in 2022
Oko
Spacecraft launched by Molniya-M rockets